Kronverkskoye Municipal Okrug is a municipal okrug of Petrogradsky District of the federal city of St. Petersburg, Russia. Population:  

The okrug borders Bolshoy Avenue in the north, Kamenny Island Avenue in the east, the Neva River in the south, and Vvdenskaya Street and Kronverksky Avenue in the west.

Places of interest include the Peter and Paul Fortress, Leningrad Zoo, and the Artillery Museum.

References

Petrogradsky District